The Guianan piedmont and lowland moist forests (NT0182) is an ecoregion in the south of Venezuela and the north of Brazil. It is in the Amazon biome.
The ecoregion is relatively intact, largely protected by conservation units or indigenous territories, and less threatened by global warming than flatter and more deforested regions.

Location
The Guianan piedmont and lowland moist forests ecoregion is in the south of Venezuela and the north of the Brazilian states of Amazonas and Roraima.
It surrounds sections of the Guayanan Highlands moist forests, which in turn surround areas of tepui.
It includes or adjoins patches of Rio Negro campinarana.
To the north the ecoregion adjoins the Llanos, and to the east it adjoins the Guianan moist forests and the Guianan savanna.
To the southeast it adjoins the Uatuma–Trombetas moist forests, and to the south and southwest it adjoins the Negro–Branco moist forests.

Ecology

The Guianan piedmont and lowland moist forests ecoregion is in the Neotropical realm and the tropical and subtropical moist broadleaf forests biome.

Climate

The Köppen climate classification is "Af": equatorial, fully humid.
Temperatures are relatively steady throughout the year, slightly cooler in July–September and slightly warmer in April–May.

Flora

As of 2005 the Brazilian portion of the ecoregion preserved 73.4% of its original vegetation.

Fauna

Endangered mammals include black bearded saki (Chiropotes satanas), Fernandez's sword-nosed bat (Lonchorhina fernandezi) and giant otter (Pteronura brasiliensis).
The white-tailed deer (Odocoileus virginianus) is invasive.

Status

As of 2012 the ecoregion had not been heavily exploited by humans, and various approaches to conservation were being followed.
As of 2009 , or 78.1%, was protected to some extent.
A 2014 WWF report stated that protected areas covered 26% and indigenous territories covered 47%, for a total of 73%.
Protected areas include the El Caura Forest Reserve, Estación Biológica El Frío, Imataca Forest Reserve, Maracá Ecological Reserve and Canaima National Park.

Global warming will force tropical species to migrate uphill to find areas with suitable temperature and rainfall.
The Guianan piedmont and lowland moist forests ecoregion is among the least vulnerable in the Amazon region in this respect, while low, flat and deforested ecoregions such as the Tocantins–Araguaia–Maranhão moist forests are extremely vulnerable.
For the purpose of conserving threatened neotropical mammals the ecoregion is considered to be at medium risk.

Notes

Sources

Ecoregions of Brazil
Ecoregions of Venezuela
Amazon biome
Neotropical tropical and subtropical moist broadleaf forests